Anton Aleksandrovich Ponkrashov (born April 23, 1986) is a Russian professional basketball player for Nizhny Novgorod of the VTB United League.

Professional career
Ponkrashov joined Pulkovo during the 2001–02 season. He moved to LenVo Saint Petersburg for the 2002–03 season. He then moved to Spartak St. Petersburg for the 2004–05 season. He then joined CSKA Moscow for the 2006–07 season. He then moved to Khimki Moscow Region for the 2007–08 season and he returned to CSKA Moscow before the 2009–10 season.

Ponkrashov has played for the Phoenix Suns in the NBA Summer League in 2010. On July 21, 2010 he signed a two-year contract with Spartak Saint Petersburg. In July 2011 he signed a two-year contract with an option for a third year with CSKA Moscow. He left CSKA again in June 2013.

On February 16, 2014, he signed with Lokomotiv Kuban for the rest of the season. On August 17, 2014, he signed with Krasny Oktyabr. On December 31, 2014 he left Krasny Oktyabr and signed a three-year deal with UNICS Kazan. On June 15, 2017, he re-signed with UNICS.

On July 17, 2019, he signed with Zenit Saint Petersburg of the VTB United League.  On July 7, 2020, Ponkrashov was released from the Russian club.

On February 3, 2021, he has signed with Khimki of the VTB United League. Ponkrashov averaged 5.2 points, 3.1 assists, and 3.0 rebounds per game.

On October 7, 2021, he signed with Nazm Avaran Sirjan of the Iranian Basketball Super League.

On July 15, 2022, he signed with Nizhny Novgorod of the VTB United League.

National team career
Ponkrashov is also a member of the senior Russian national basketball team. With the Russian national team he won the gold medal at the 2007 FIBA European Championship, a bronze medal at the 2012 Summer Olympics and a bronze medal at the 2011 European Championships.

References

External links

 
 Anton Ponkrashov at draftexpress.com
 Anton Ponkrashov at euroleague.net
 Anton Ponkrashov at fiba.com

1986 births
Living people
2010 FIBA World Championship players
Basketball players at the 2012 Summer Olympics
Basketball players from Saint Petersburg
BC Khimki players
BC Krasnye Krylia players
BC Krasny Oktyabr players
BC Nizhny Novgorod players
BC Spartak Saint Petersburg players
BC UNICS players
BC Zenit Saint Petersburg players
FIBA EuroBasket-winning players
Medalists at the 2012 Summer Olympics
Olympic basketball players of Russia
Olympic bronze medalists for Russia
Olympic medalists in basketball
PBC CSKA Moscow players
PBC Lokomotiv-Kuban players
Point guards
Russian men's basketball players
Shooting guards
Small forwards